Miguel Melitón Delgado Pardavé (17 May 1905 – 2 January 1994) was a Mexican film director and screenwriter best known for directing thirty-three of Cantinflas' films, under contract of Posa Films. He directed 139 films between 1941 and 1990. His film The Three Musketeers was entered into the 1946 Cannes Film Festival.

Selected filmography 

 The Unknown Policeman (1941)
 The Three Musketeers (1942)
 Doña Bárbara (1943)
 El secreto de la solterona (1944)
 Gran Hotel (1944)
 Michael Strogoff (1944)
 A Day with the Devil (1945)
 I Am a Fugitive (1946)
 Fly Away, Young Man! (1947)
 The Genius (1948)
 The Magician (1949)
 The Atomic Fireman (1952)
 The Photographer (1953)
 Your Memory and Me (1953)
 The Sixth Race (1953)
 A Tailored Gentleman (1954) 
 Drop the Curtain (1955) 
 Las Viudas del Cha Cha Cha (1955)
 El bolero de Raquel (1957)
 Sube y baja (1959)
 The Illiterate One (1961)
 The Extra (1962)
 Immediate Delivery (1963)
 El padrecito (1964)
 El señor doctor (1965)
 Su Excelencia (1967)
 Por mis pistolas (1968)
 Un Quijote sin mancha (1969)
 El profe (1971)
 Conserje en condominio (1973)
 Bellas de noche (1975)
 El ministro y yo (1976)
 El patrullero 777 (1978)
 El barrendero (1982)

References

External links
 
 

1905 births
1994 deaths
Deaths from cancer in Mexico
Mexican film directors
20th-century Mexican screenwriters
20th-century Mexican male writers